Camino al Amor is an Argentine telenovela co-produced by L.C. Action Productions and Telefe Contenidos. It premiered on Monday May 26, 2014, at 10:00 pm on the Telefe screen.

Starring Sebastián Estevanez, Carina Zampini, Juan Darthés and Sol Estevanez, with the antagonistic participations of Sofía Reca, Mariano Argento, Josefina Scaglione, Leticia Bredice, Roberto Vallejos and Matías Desiderio. It features the star performances of the first actors Betiana Blum, Rodolfo Bebán, Silvia Kutika and Tina Serrano and the special participations of Mariano Martínez and María Eugenia Suárez.

Plot
Rocco Colucci (Sebastián Estevanez), based in Mexico, has a business of tourist activities, "Rocco Turismo", at the Paradisus Cancun hotel. He celebrates his wedding with Guadalupe (Sofía Reca), who works in the position of Head of Reception, and who has a daughter, Wendy, but in reality she is not her mother, since she stole it when she was barely few days. During the wedding, held in the hotel's gazebo, he receives the call from his sister Gina (Sol Estevanez), communicating the heart attack suffered by his father, Armando (Rodolfo Bebán), with whom Rocco maintains a distancing since discovering the double life he had with Lili (Silvia Kutika), the sister of her mother's best friend, who committed suicide after learning of her husband's betrayal.

Rocco travels to Buenos Aires, full of contradictions, especially regarding who was the great love of his life, Malena Menéndez (Carina Zampini), Lili's niece, whom he abandoned because he considered her wrong, accomplice of the infidelity that unleashed his mother's suicide. Malena, at this time, has married Fernando (Matías Desiderio), with whom she had a son, Tomás. But Fernando fled eight months ago from their lives, due to gambling debts he contracted and led him to suffer threats. The reunion between Rocco and Malena will soon take place, so that they both rediscover the passion that is still alive between them.

Vitto (Mariano Martínez), is the youngest son of an extramarital relationship that Armando Colucci lived with Lili. He is a womanizer type of person, who works in the moving company. He will fall in love with Pía (María Eugenia Suárez), a young woman rebelled to the upper class in which she cradled, who will appear accidentally in her life.

On the other hand, Ángel (Juan Darthés) is Amanda's son (Betiana Blum), is a type of good feeling that is a taxi driver by trade, a vocation singer and a "almost doctor" by profession. Ángel will meet Gina, with whom he will live a passionate love.

Production and airing
The lead actors of Camino al amor are Sebastián Estevanez and Carina Zampini, the same lead actors of the 2012 telenovela Dulce amor. With their work, the telenovela tries to keep the fans of their previous work. Rodolfo Bebán and Betiana Blum are another couple, both are senior actors with prolific careers. Mariano Martínez and María Eugenia Suárez are usually associated with telenovelas from Pol-ka rather than Telefe, and were selected to get a portion of their regular audience.

The premiere of the telenovela had 22.1 rating points. However, as Telefe airs four telenovelas in the prime time (Somos Familia, Camino al Amor, the Brazilian Avenida Brasil, and Sres. Papis), it is aired in episodes of half an hour. Sebastián Estevanez commented that short episodes may be inadvisable for the early stages of a telenovela, when it is trying to establish the story and attract an audience, whereas Avenida Brasil may suffer less from it because it was airing their last ones. Carina Zampini commented that the production was asking for episodes of a complete hour. Avenida Brasil ended the Argentine airing on July 7, and Camino al Amor was expanded to a full hour after that.

Iternacional Location
The scenes of Mexico were recorded in Cancun, where the support of the Office of Visitors and Conventions of Cancun and the Hotel Paradisus Cancun Resort, of the hotel chain Meliã Hotels International. The Management Driver, Antonio Torres Avila, was responsible for interpreting the Priest who married them at the Hotel.

Cast
 Sebastián Estevanez as Rocco Colucci
 Mariano Martínez as Vitto Colucci
 Juan Darthés as Ángel Rossi/Ángel Colucci
 Carina Zampini as Malena Menéndez
 María Eugenia Suárez as Pía Arriaga
 Sofía Reca as Guadalupe "Lupe" Alcorta
 Sol Estevanez as Gina Colucci/Gina Levin
 Betiana Blum as Amanda Rossi
 Silvia Kutika as Liliana "Lili" Suárez
 Rodolfo Bebán as Armando Colucci
 Eva De Dominici as Valentina Rossi/Valentina Colucci
 Pablo Martínez as Polo Gaetán
 Josefina Scaglione as Florencia Ríos
 Mariano Argento as Alfonso Arriaga
 Martina Gusmán as Vanesa De La Guarda 
 Raúl Taibo as Agustín De La Guarda
 Leticia Brédice as Guillermina Dubois
 Tina Serrano as Nelly Menéndez
 Héctor Calori as Benjamín Levin
 Roberto Vallejos as Camilo Guevara
 Matías Desiderio as Fernando Aguirre
 Alejandro Porro as Tomás Aguirre
 Narella Clausen as Wendy Nieves
 Esteban Prol as Pedro Oberti
 Lucas Velasco as Gabriel "Gabo" Sánchez
 Chachi Telescto as Juliana "Chuni" Mendoza
 Adrián Navarro as Manuel
 Hernán Estevanez as El Mencho
 Fernanda Metilli as Marilina
 Fabio Di Tomaso as Bautista
 Naím Sibara as Delirio
 Pepe Novoa as Montesino
 Valentina Godfrid as Cinthia

References

External links

 Official site 
 

Argentine telenovelas
Spanish-language telenovelas
2014 telenovelas
Telefe telenovelas
2014 Argentine television series debuts
2014 Argentine television series endings
Television shows set in Buenos Aires
Television shows set in Mexico